The Theil index is a statistic primarily used to measure economic inequality and other economic phenomena, though it has also been used to measure racial segregation.

The Theil index TT is the same as redundancy in information theory which is the maximum possible entropy of the data minus the observed entropy. It is a special case of the generalized entropy index. It can be viewed as a measure of redundancy, lack of diversity, isolation, segregation, inequality, non-randomness, and compressibility. It was proposed by a Dutch econometrician Henri Theil (1924-2000) at the Erasmus University Rotterdam.

Henri Theil himself said (1967): "The (Theil) index can be interpreted as the expected information content of the indirect message which transforms the population shares as prior probabilities into the income shares as posterior probabilities."

Amartya Sen noted, "But the fact remains that the Theil index is an arbitrary formula, and the average of the logarithms of the reciprocals of income shares weighted by income is not a measure that is exactly overflowing with intuitive sense."

Formula
For a population of N "agents" each with characteristic x, the situation may be represented by the list xi (i = 1,...,N) where xi is the characteristic of agent i. For example, if the characteristic is income, then xi is the income of agent i.

The Theil T index is defined as

 

and the Theil L index is defined as

 

where  is the mean income:
 

Theil-L is an income-distribution's dis-entropy per person, measured with respect to maximum entropy (...which is achieved with complete equality).

(In an alternative interpretation of it, Theil-L is the natural-logarithm of the geometric-mean of the ratio: (mean income)/(income i), over all the incomes. The related Atkinson(1) is just 1 minus the geometric-mean of (income i)/(mean income),over the income distribution.)

Because a transfer between a larger income & a smaller one will change the smaller income's ratio more than it changes the larger income's ratio, the transfer-principle is satisfied by this index.

Equivalently, if the situation is characterized by a discrete distribution function fk (k = 0,...,W) where  fk is the fraction of the population with income k and W = Nμ is the total income, then   and the Theil index is:

 

where  is again the mean income:
 

Note that in this case income k is an integer and k=1 represents the smallest increment of income possible (e.g., cents).

if the situation is characterized by a continuous distribution function f(k) (supported from 0 to infinity) where  f(k) dk is the fraction of the population with income k to k + dk, then the Theil index is:

where the mean is:

 

Theil indices for some common continuous probability distributions are given in the table below:

{| class="wikitable" style="float: left; margin-left: 1em;"
|-
! Income distribution function !! PDF(x) (x ≥ 0) !! Theil coefficient (nats)
|-
| Dirac delta function ||  || 0
|-
| Uniform distribution
||
|| 
|-
| Exponential distribution
||
|| 
|-
| Log-normal distribution
||
||
|-
| Pareto distribution
||
||    (α>1)
|-
| Chi-squared distribution
||
|| 
|-
| Gamma distribution
||
|| 
|-
| Weibull distribution
||
|| 
|}

If everyone has the same income, then TT equals 0.  If one person has all the income, then TT gives the result , which is maximum inequality. Dividing TT by  can normalize the equation to range from 0 to 1, but then the independence axiom is violated:  and does not qualify as a measure of inequality.
 
The Theil index measures an entropic "distance" the population is away from the egalitarian state of everyone having the same income. The numerical result is in terms of negative entropy so that a higher number indicates more order that is further away from the complete equality. Formulating the index to represent negative entropy instead of entropy allows it to be a measure of inequality rather than equality.

Relation to Atkinson Index

The Theil index can be transformed into an Atkinson index, which has a range between 0 and 1 (0% and 100%), where 0 indicates perfect equality and 1 (100%) indicates maximum inequality. (See Generalized entropy index for the transformation.)

Derivation from entropy
The Theil index is derived from Shannon's measure of information entropy , where entropy is a measure of randomness in a given set of information. In information theory, physics, and the Theil index, the general form of entropy is

where
 is an individual item from the set (such as an individual member from a population, or an individual byte from a computer file).
 is the probability of finding  from a random sample from the set.
 is a constant.

When looking at the distribution of income in a population,  is equal to the ratio of a particular individual's income to the total income of the entire population. This gives the observed entropy  of a population to be:

where
 is the income of a particular individual.
 is the total income of the entire population, with 
 being the number of individuals in the population.
 ("x bar") being the average income of the population.
 is the natural logarithm of : .
 
The Theil index  measures how far the observed entropy (which represents how randomly income is distributed) is from the highest possible entropy (which represents income being maximally distributed amongst individuals in the population– a distribution analogous to the [most likely] outcome of an infinite number of random coin tosses: an equal distribution of heads and tails). Therefore, the Theil index is the difference between the theoretical maximum entropy (which would be reached if the incomes of every individual were equal) minus the observed entropy:

 
When  is in units of population/species,  is a measure of biodiversity and is called the Shannon index.  If the Theil index is used with x=population/species, it is a measure of inequality of population among a set of species, or "bio-isolation" as opposed to "wealth isolation".

The Theil index measures what is called redundancy in information theory. It is the left over "information space" that was not utilized to convey information, which reduces the effectiveness of the price signal. The Theil index is a measure of the redundancy of income (or other measure of wealth) in some individuals.  Redundancy in some individuals implies scarcity in others.  A high Theil index indicates the total income is not distributed evenly among individuals in the same way an uncompressed text file does not have a similar number of byte locations assigned to the available unique byte characters.

Decomposability
According to the World Bank,"The best-known entropy measures are Theil’s T and Theil’s L, both of which allow one to decompose inequality into the part that is due to inequality within areas (e.g. urban, rural) and the part that is due to differences between areas (e.g. the rural-urban income gap). Typically at least three-quarters of inequality in a country is due to within-group inequality, and the remaining quarter to between-group differences."

If the population is divided into  subgroups and 
  is the income share of group , 
  is the Theil index for that subgroup, 
  is the average income in group , and 
  is the average income of the population,

then Theil's T index is

  for  

For example, inequality within the United States is the average inequality within each state, weighted by state income, plus the inequality between states.

Note: This image is not the Theil Index in each area of the United States, but of contributions to the Theil Index for the U.S. by each area. The Theil Index is always positive, although individual contributions to the Theil Index may be negative or positive.

The decomposition of the Theil index which identifies the share attributable to the between-region component becomes a helpful tool for the positive analysis of regional inequality as it suggests the relative importance of spatial dimension of inequality.

Theil's T versus Theil's L 
Both Theil's T and Theil's L are decomposable. The difference between them is based on the part of the outcomes distribution that each is used for. Indexes of inequality in the generalized entropy (GE) family are more sensitive to differences in income shares among the poor or among the rich depending on a parameter that defines the GE index. The smaller the parameter value for GE, the more sensitive it is to differences at the bottom of the distribution.

 GE(0) = Theil's L and is more sensitive to differences at the lower end of the distribution. It is also referred to as the mean log deviation measure.

 GE(1) = Theil's T and is more sensitive to differences at the top of the distribution.

The decomposability is a property of the Theil index which the more popular Gini coefficient does not offer.  The Gini coefficient is more intuitive to many people since it is based on the Lorenz curve.  However, it is not easily decomposable like the Theil.

Applications
In addition to multitude of economic applications, the Theil index has been applied to assess performance of irrigation systems and distribution of software metrics.

Application in OECD 
The Theil index is used for measuring regional inequalities by OECD (the Organisation for Economic Co-operation and Development), whereas the Theil index is defined as

Note: The index allocates an equal weight to each region irrespective of its extent; hence differencies in the values of the index among countries could be partially due to differences in the average size of regions in each of the countries.

See also

 Generalized entropy index
 Atkinson index
 Gini coefficient
 Hoover index
 Income inequality metrics
 Suits index
 Wealth condensation
 Diversity index

Notes

References

External links 
 Software:
 Free Online Calculator computes the Gini Coefficient, plots the Lorenz curve, and computes many other measures of concentration for any dataset
 Free Calculator: Online and downloadable scripts (Python and Lua) for Atkinson, Gini, and Hoover inequalities
 Users of the R data analysis software can install the "ineq" package which allows for computation of a variety of inequality indices including Gini, Atkinson, Theil.
 A MATLAB Inequality Package , including code for computing Gini, Atkinson, Theil indexes and for plotting the Lorenz Curve. Many examples are available.

Information theory
Income inequality metrics
Welfare economics